The Highway of Tears is a  corridor of Highway 16 between Prince George and Prince Rupert in British Columbia, Canada, which has been the location of many missing and murdered indigenous women (MMIW) beginning in 1970. The phrase was coined during a vigil held in Terrace, British Columbia in 1998, by Florence Naziel, who was thinking of the victims' families crying over their loved ones. There are a disproportionately high number of indigenous women on the list of victims.

Proposed explanations for the years-long endurance of the crimes and the limited progress in identifying culprits include poverty, drug abuse, widespread domestic violence, disconnection with traditional culture and disruption of the family unit through the foster care system and Canadian Indian residential school system. Poverty in particular leads to low rates of car ownership and mobility; thus, hitchhiking is often the only way for many to travel vast distances to see family or go to work, school, or seek medical treatment. Another factor leading to abductions and murders is that the area is largely isolated and remote, with soft soil in many areas and carnivorous scavengers to carry away human remains; these factors precipitate violent attacks, as perpetrators feel a sense of impunity, privacy, and the ability to easily carry out their crimes and hide evidence.

Victims 
The victims were mostly indigenous women, hence the term missing and murdered Indigenous women (MMIW). Accounts vary as to the exact number of victims. According to the RCMP Project E-Pana, the number of victims is fewer than 18, while Aboriginal organizations estimate that the number of missing and murdered women is higher than 40.

The table below lists all the known women who went missing, were murdered, or died of unknown causes in the Highway of Tears. E-Pana cases are categorized in the table.

Investigation and suspects 

The first investigation by RCMP that tried to look at Highway of Tears as linked cases was opened in December 1998. However, the list of cases as it existed back then included three additional male victims – Larry Vu, Eric Charles Coss and Phillip Innes Fraser, which are not considered linked today.

To date, a number of people have been convicted in cases related to the Highway of Tears. Three serial killers are among those charged, Brian Peter Arp, Edward Dennis Isaac and Cody Legebokoff.

Although he was not publicly implicated in any Highway of Tears cases, Bobby Jack Fowler was implicated in numerous non-Highway-of-Tears E-Pana cases. Fowler died in prison and has never been charged in the deaths of any of the Highway of Tears victims. It is possible that Fowler was linked to the Highway of Tears cases because he worked for a now closed Prince George company called Happy's Roofing in 1974, which was the same year that Monica Ignas went missing in Terrace, BC. Former Vancouver police geographic profiler Kim Rossmo is on the record having said that in his opinion Fowler is not responsible for any of the crimes along Highway 16 between 1989 and 2006.

In 2009, police converged on a property in Isle Pierre, in rural Prince George, to search for the remains of Nicole Hoar, a young tree planter who went missing on Highway 16 on 21 June 2002. The property was once owned by Leland "Chuggy" Vincent Switzer, who served a prison sentence for the second-degree murder of his brother and is out on day parole as of late 2016. The RCMP also searched the property for the other missing women from the Highway of Tears; however, no further actions followed the investigation.

RCMP Sgt. Wayne Clary said they may never solve all of the cases and that it will be the "people in the communities that are going to solve these crimes." They do have persons of interest in several cases, but not enough evidence to lay charges.

B.C. government email scandal 
In an official government report, ministerial assistant George Gretes was accused of being irresponsible for "triple deleting" all emails relating to the Highway of Tears from the email account of Tim Duncan, former executive assistant to Transportation minister Todd Stone.

On 22 October 2015, Elizabeth Denham, the Information and Privacy Commissioner of British Columbia, published a 65-page report outlining how B.C. government officials had "triple deleted" emails relating to the Highway of Tears. In her report Access Denied, Denham describes the act of "triple deleting" as transferring an email to the "deleted" folder on a computer system, deleting the email from the folder and then overriding the backup that permits the system to retrieve deleted items. By deleting these files, Denham states the government had breached the Freedom of Information and Protection of Privacy Act. Denham became aware of the scandal in May 2015 after she received a letter from Tim Duncan, the former executive assistant to Transportation Minister Todd Stone. Duncan claimed that as he was responding to an FOI (Freedom of Information) application, ministerial assistant George Gretes ordered for Duncan to search his records for any files pertaining to the Highway of Tears and missing women. Once the files were located, Duncan testified that Gretes ordered for them to be deleted. When Duncan hesitated, Gretes allegedly took the keyboard and "triple deleted" all of the emails relating to the Highway of Tears. According to Denham, Gretes originally denied this claim but later admitted to the triple deletion during a second police interview. Denham states that Gretes—who resigned from his job in October 2015—would have then lied under oath. A year earlier in the summer of 2014, a team from the Transportation Ministry toured Highway 16 and conducted numerous meetings with Aboriginal leaders and communities. The significance of this project was to produce safer travel solutions for women living along Highway 16, many of whom had turned to hitchhiking as a way of transportation. In November 2014, the NDP made the FOI request seeking all government files pertaining to missing women, the Highway of Tears and meetings arranged by the ministry: the report Duncan would later respond to. Despite a two-month tour and multiple meetings, the B.C. government claimed the FOI request produced no files relating to the Highway of Tears. According to Denham's report, these records did exist until government officials destroyed them in order to "skirt freedom of information laws". In Access Denied, Denham called upon the RCMP to further investigate the triple deletion of government files. In November 2015, Vancouver lawyer Mark Jetté was appointed as special prosecutor within the RCMP investigation. Jetté will act as the RCMP's independent legal adviser as well as administer an independent assessment of the evidence. He will also pursue any criminal charges that may be found appropriate.

Gretes was convicted of one count of lying to the British Columbia privacy commissioner and fined $2,500.

Project E-Pana 
In 2005, the RCMP launched a provincially funded project, E-Pana, which started with a focus on some of the unsolved murders and disappearances of female children and young women along Highway 16. E-Pana sought to discover if there was a single serial killer at work or a multitude of killers operating along the highway. The unit started with 3 cases in 2005, then the unit investigated 9 cases in 2006, but by 2007, its caseload had doubled to 18 and its geographical scope began spanning large parts of the province and not just the Highway of Tears.

The victims involved within the E-Pana investigation followed the criteria of being female, participating in a high-risk lifestyle, known to hitchhike and were last seen or their bodies were discovered within a mile from Highway 16, Highway 97 and Highway 5. In the 2009/2010 year, E-Pana received over $5 million in annual funding but has since declined due to budget cutbacks; receiving only $806,109 for the 2013/2014 year. In 2013, Craig Callens, the RCMP deputy commissioner, warned that further budget reductions from the provincial government would greatly affect the Highway of Tears investigations; however, he didn't say this would affect the E-Pana cases which aren't Highway of Tears. A 2014 freedom-of-information request stated that the task force had dropped from 70 officers to 12 officers since 2010. E-Pana is responsible for linking the homicide of 16-year-old Colleen MacMillen, who was killed in 1974, with the now-deceased American criminal Bobby Jack Fowler. E-Pana now considers Fowler a suspect in the murders of two other highway victims, Gale Weys and Pamela Darlington, both of whom were killed in the 1970s. In 2014, investigations by E-Pana and the Provincial Unsolved Homicide Unit brought murder charges against Garry Taylor Handlen for the death of 12-year-old Monica Jack in 1978. He was found guilty by jury and sentenced to life in prison in early 2019, thus Monica Jack's murder becomes the first file in Project E-Pana to officially be solved with full court proceedings and sentence. E-Pana is still investigating the remaining unsolved cases although it is unlikely that all will be solved. E-Pana is not Highway of Tears, nor is Highway of Tears E-Pana, although some cases overlap.

Racism 
Some critics argue that the lack of results arising from this investigation is the result of systemic racism. This was also reported to be an issue in the case of Vancouver's missing women and the Robert Pickton murders. The issue of systemic racism in these cases is explored in Finding Dawn, the 2006 documentary by Christine Welsh whose film includes a section on the Highway of Tears victim Ramona Wilson, including interviews with family and community members.

Activists argue that media coverage of these cases has been limited, claiming that "media assign a lesser value to aboriginal women". Furthermore, despite the fact that these disappearances date back as far as 1970, it was not until 2005 that an RCMP task force was launched to look into similarities between the cases. Nicole Hoar, a Caucasian woman who disappeared in 2002 received a disproportionate amount of media attention at the time of her disappearance. Hers was the first of the Highway of Tears cases to be covered in The Globe and Mail, Vancouver Sun, and Edmonton Journal. Gladys Radek, a native activist and the aunt of victim Tamara Chipman, "believes that if it weren't for Hoar, the police would have invested less effort in investigating cases, and the media would have done little, if anything, to inform the public about the tragedies along the road."

Recommendation reports 
Numerous municipalities and 23 First Nations communities border the Highway of Tears. The rural region is plagued with poverty and lacks public transportation; many residents turn to hitchhiking as a form of transit or partake in high risk lifestyles to survive.

Poverty and a lack of public transit has forced many disadvantaged Aboriginal women to turn to hitchhiking as a cheap means of transportation along Highway 16. Many of the Highway of Tears victims were last seen or reported to be hitchhiking before their disappearances. In March 2006, various Aboriginal groups hosted a two-day Highway of Tears symposium at the CN Center in Prince George. In attendance to the event were the victim's families and over 500 Aboriginal leaders from across British Columbia. Shortly thereafter, the Highway of Tears Symposium Recommendation Report was issued with 33 recommendations to improve public transit, deter hitchhiking, and prevent violence towards Aboriginal women. Some of the recommendations from the report include a shuttle bus operation along Highway 16, improved educational, health and social services for Aboriginal people as well counseling and mental health groups organized by Aboriginal workers. These propositions are part of a long-term recommendation to directly confront the issue of First Nations inter-generational poverty. The Highway of Tears Symposium Recommendation Report was endorsed by B.C. inquiry commissioner Wally Oppal in his 2012 Missing Women Commission of Inquiry recommendations. Oppal's public inquiry report into the Robert Pickton case demanded urgent transportation improvement along Highway 16. Like the Highway of Tears Symposium Recommendation Report, Oppal's report also suggested implementing a shuttle bus service along Highway 16 to deter young women from hitchhiking.

On 24 November 2015, the First Nations Health Authority and B.C. Ministry of Transportation and Infrastructure held the Northern Transportation Symposium in Smithers, British Columbia. The symposium included Aboriginal communities and municipalities along Highway 16 and focused on the issue of medical and non-medical transportation in those regions. Discussions included and expanded upon the 2006 Highway of Tears Symposium Recommendation Report and the 2012 Missing Women Commission of Inquiry recommendations.

In June 2016, Transportation Minister Todd Stone announced that as the result of collaboration across local communities, a bus service would become available along Highway 16. The project will be joint funded by the federal government and the government of British Columbia.

In June 2017, a subsidized transit service began operations on alternating days along a  section between Prince George and Burns Lake.

Media and awareness efforts 

 Highway of Tears totem pole raised by family of Tamara Chipman in Kitsumkalum, 4 September 2020.
 SERIAL KILLER: Highway of Tears is a Crime Junkies podcast that was broadcast 15 December 2019.
 Cold Track is a script written by French writer Sylvain Blanchot based on the Highway Of Tears. 
 Finding Dawn (2006) is a documentary film by Métis filmmaker Christine Welsh, about 16-year-old Ramona Wilson, one of the victims found alongside the highway. Welsh's documentary highlights the reality that Aboriginal women face today: in the past 30 years, an estimated 500 Aboriginal women have gone missing or have been murdered in Canada. Welsh uncovers the social, economic, and historical factors that contribute to this statistic. The film can be accessed online on the Nation Film Board web page.
 The Vanishing of Madison Scott, a documentary produced and directed by Steven Scouller.
 48 Hours: "Highway of Tears" (season 25, episode 7), about the Highway of Tears murders, airdate 17 November 2012.
 Highway of Tears (March 2014), an 80-minute documentary by Canadian filmmakers Matthew Smiley and Carly Pope, narrated by Canadian actor Nathan Fillion. The documentary, which was featured in numerous film festivals, raises awareness about the stretch of highway and missing women. In a 2014 interview with CBC, Smiley said that during the editing of the film "over 400 [indigenous] women were estimated to be missing and or murdered across Canada. By the time we premiered the film, the number was over 600 in March of 2014, then the numbers increased to 900 and now over 1,200 missing and murdered indigenous women across Canada. We cannot turn a blind eye to this."
 Searchers: The Highway of Tears (2015), a mini-series produced by the online newscast VICE, highlights the story of various Aboriginal women who have disappeared along the Highway of Tears and brings attention to the family, friends, and detectives fighting for justice. VICE also offers online articles pertaining to the Highway of Tears murders and disappearances.
 Canada's Missing & Murdered Aboriginal Women is a series of 14 short episodes, aired on CBC's flagship news program The National. The series is accessible at The National's YouTube channel, under the playlist Canada's Missing & Murdered Aboriginal Women.
 That Lonely Section of Hell: The Botched Investigation of a Serial Killer Who Almost Got Away (13 October 2015), is a memoir for which its author, Lorimer Shenher, was nominated for the B.C. Book Prize. Shenher writes from the perspective of a former reporter and the first police detective to be assigned to the case of the missing women. They also cover the police culture in detail.
 Highway Of Tears is the name of a 2011 studio album by Vancouver, BC musician Pernell Reichert featuring the track "Highway Of Tears (Song For Nicole)", a dedication to Nicole Hoar who disappeared in 2002.
 The Stacey Dooley Investigates episode entitled "Canada’s Lost Girls", first broadcast on 7 March 2017, where Dooley met the family of Amber Tuccaro, who went missing in 2010 aged 20.
 "Highway of Tears: A True Story of Racism, Indifference, and the Pursuit of Justice for Missing and Murdered Indigenous Women and Girls" by Jessica McDiarmid, Atria Books, November 12, 2019.

See also
Canadian Indian residential school system
Sixties Scoop
Ministry of Children and Family Development (British Columbia)
Truth and Reconciliation Commission of Canada
Missing and murdered Indigenous women

References

External links 

 Private Highway of Tears Website
 Highway of Tears Symposium Recommendation Report
 Highway of Tears documentary film Website

 
Missing person cases in Canada
Royal Canadian Mounted Police
Suspected serial killers
Unidentified serial killers